William H. Beaver (born 1940) is an accounting researcher and educator.  He is the Joan E. Horngren Professor of Accounting, Emeritus, at Stanford University.  Early in his career, he was professor at University of Chicago.

He served as president of the American Accounting Association from 1979 to 1981.

In 1989, he was awarded the Seminal Contributions in Accounting Literature Award for his article 
"Information Content of Annual Earnings Announcements" published in Journal of Accounting Research in 1968.

He received the Outstanding Accounting Educator Award of the American Accounting Association in 1990.

In 1996, he was one of three inductees to the Accounting Hall of Fame.

References

Biography at OSU's Accounting Hall of Fame

1940 births
Living people
Accounting academics
Stanford University Graduate School of Business faculty
University of Chicago faculty
University of Notre Dame alumni